Pilar Pedraza Martínez (born 12 October 1951) is a Spanish professor and writer. Her work has two main aspects: horror narrative and essay.

Biography
After earning her doctorate in History at the University of Valencia, Pilar Pedraza has been teaching Film and avant-garde cinema there since 1982. She was Councilor of Culture of the Generalitat Valenciana from 1993 to 1995, during the last term of Joan Lerma, and member of the Board of Directors of RTVV. Throughout her career, she has combined teaching and research with literary creation.

Writing

Narrative
Pilar Pedraza's stories and novels present disturbing characters and environments, in which the sinister presence of the supernatural (dead that return to life, demons, enchanted objects) is associated with madness, death, and sadomasochistic pleasure. This theme, which dominates her first novel, Las joyas de la serpiente (1984), undergoes a gradual stylization in subsequent deliveries. In La perra de Alejandría (2003) Pedraza offers a peculiar version of the story of Hypatia (Melanta, in the novel), who is presented as a victim of the confrontation between the cult of Dionysus and that of Christ, led by the bishop Críspulo (an analogue of Cyril of Alexandria).

Essay
Pedraza's research focuses on three fields: art and society of the Renaissance and Baroque, cinema, and misogyny. The trilogy formed by La bella, enigma y pesadilla (1991), Máquinas de amar. Secretos del Cuerpo Artificial (1998), and Espectra. Descenso a las criptas de la literatura y el cine (2004) – the latter winning the 2005 Premio Ignotus for best essay book – explores different facets of fear and fascination caused in man by the image of the sinister woman, seen as a lethal seductress, android without soul, or corpse that defies death. Venus barbuda y el eslabón perdido (2009) continues this research path, addressing the bearded or hairy woman as a freak who transgresses the border between the two sexes and links the woman with the animal.

Translation
Pedraza translated Francesco Colonna's work Hypnerotomachia Poliphili into Spanish as Sueño de Polífilo.

Works

Narratives

Awards
 1984 City of Valencia Award for Las joyas de la serpiente
 1984 Critics' Award for Las joyas de la serpiente
 2005 Premio Ignotus for Espectra. Descenso a las criptas de la literatura y el cine
 2013 Nocte Award for Lucifer Circus
 2016 Premio Sheridan Le Fanu de la Semana Gótica de Madrid for her literary career

References

External links
 

1951 births
20th-century Spanish educators
Spanish women educators
20th-century Spanish novelists
20th-century Spanish women writers
21st-century Spanish educators
21st-century Spanish novelists
21st-century Spanish women writers
Horror writers
Italian–Spanish translators
Latin–Spanish translators
Living people
People from Toledo, Spain
Spanish feminist writers
Spanish translators
Spanish women essayists
Spanish women novelists
Spanish women short story writers
Spanish short story writers
University of Valencia alumni
Academic staff of the University of Valencia
20th-century women educators
21st-century women educators